Pristimantis simonbolivari is a species of frog in the family Strabomantidae. It is endemic to Ecuador and known only from the region of its type locality, Cashca Totoras, Cordillera Occidental, in the Bolívar Province (central Ecuador). The specific name simonbolivari honors Simón Bolívar. Common name Simon's ground frog has been proposed for it.

Description
Adult males measure  and adult females  in snout–vent length. The snout is short. The tympanum is visible but indistinct; no supratympanic fold is present. The finger tips are dilated into small pads that are less developed in the inner two fingers. The toe tips have small discs. No toe webbing or lateral fringes are present. Dorsal coloration is dark brown (females, sometimes with reddish tone) or reddish brown with darker spots (males). The venter is orange in males but dark brown to black  with lighter spots in females. The iris is gray with a median horizontal brown streak.

Habitat and conservation
Specimens have been found in leaf litter, under rotten logs, under moss growing on logs, and under rocks. It is locally abundant. It is threatened by habitat loss and degradation caused by agriculture and logging.

References

simonbolivari
Amphibians of the Andes
Amphibians of Ecuador
Endemic fauna of Ecuador
Amphibians described in 1992
Taxa named by Luis Aurelio Coloma
Simón Bolívar
Taxonomy articles created by Polbot